Zahgidiwin/love is a 2016 play by Frances Koncan about the residential school system in Canada. It won the Harry Rintoul Award in 2016.

Production 
Zahgidiwin/love is written and directed by Anishnaabe play-write Frances Koncan.

The play is one hour long, the cast includes Kelsey Wavey, Erin Meagan Schwartz and Beverley Katherine.

Synopsis 
Zahgidiwin/love is a dark comedy that uses satire to explore the religious and colonial history of Canada and its residential school system.

Critical reception 
Zahgidiwin/love won the Harry Rintoul Award for the Best New Play in 2016, at the Winnipeg Fringe Theatre Festival.Shawna Dempsey, reviewing for the CBC, wrote "Holy feminist fireworks! Blazing birth of post-colonial nebula!" and described the play as "like a really good acid trip".

References 

2016 plays
Works about Canadian history
Works about Indigenous people in Canada